Fabrice Nicolino (born 1955) is a French journalist.

Biography
Fabrice Nicolino, born in Paris, has worked various trades - including as a manual worker - before becoming Editorial secretary in the Femme Actuelle weekly in 1984. He then became an investigative reporter and has since worked with a number of printed outlets, including Géo, Le Canard enchaîné, Télérama,  . He has been writing a column in the catholic daily La Croix since 2003.

He has founded with Dominique Lang a publication titled Cahiers de Saint-Lambert, which is subtitled "Facing the environmental crisis together". Since 2007, he has been writing a blog: « Planète sans visa ».

Fabrice Nicolino has been writing papers on environmental issues in the satirical weekly newspaper Charlie Hebdo since January 2010.

He was wounded after the 1985 Rivoli Beaubourg cinema bombing. He also suffered a severe leg injury during the 7 January 2015 Charlie Hebdo shooting.

Publications
Although Nicolino has written and co-written fiction and non-fiction books on a range of subjects, including some for younger audiences, the bulk of his writing addresses environmental issues such as pesticides and chemical poisoning, biofuels, or the meat industry.

 Jours sang, Fleuve Noir, 1987 
 Le Tour de France d'un écologiste, Le Seuil, 1999 
 L'Auvergne en ballon, Au pays du nouveau monde, 1999 
 Guérande, au pays du sel et des oiseaux, text for a book of photographs by Erwan Balança, L'Étrave, 2004 
 La France sauvage racontée aux enfants, Sarbacane, 2005 
 Pesticides, révélations sur un scandale français, with François Veillerette, Fayard, 2007 
 Yancuic le valeureux, illustrated by Florent Silloray, Sarbacane, 2007
 La Faim, la bagnole, le blé et nous. Une dénonciation des biocarburants, Fayard, 2007
 Le Vent du boulet, Fayard, 2009  
 Bidoche, l'industrie de la viande menace le monde, Les Liens qui Libèrent, 2009  - republished by Actes Sud  - republished as a pocket book by Babel, 2010
 Biocarburants : une fausse solution, Hachette, 2010  (Pocket publication of the 2007 book)
 Qui a tué l’écologie ?, Les Liens qui libèrent, 2011 - Re-published as a pocket book by, Seuil, coll. Le Point, 2012
 Itinéraire d'une goutte d'eau, texts for a book of photographs by Nicolas Van Ingen and Jean-François Hellio, Plume de Carotte, 2011, Les Liens qui Libèrent, 2011 
 Ma tata Thérèse, illustrated by Catherine Meurisse, éditions Sarbacane, 2012 ; youth album
 La Vérité sur la viande, collective work, Les Arènes, 2013 
 Un empoisonnement universel. Comment les produits chimiques ont envahi la planète, Les Liens qui Libèrent, 2013

See also
 Charlie Hebdo shooting

References

External links
 Blog personnel de Fabrice Nicolino
 Les Cahiers de Saint-Lambert

1955 births
Living people
French journalists
Writers from Paris
Charlie Hebdo people
20th-century French writers
21st-century French writers
French shooting survivors
20th-century French male writers
French male non-fiction writers